The following outline is provided as an overview of and topical guide to Gottfried Wilhelm Leibniz:

Gottfried Wilhelm (von) Leibniz (1 July 1646 [O.S. 21 June] – 14 November 1716); German polymath, philosopher logician, mathematician. Developed differential and integral calculus at about the same time and independently of Isaac Newton. Leibniz earned his keep as a lawyer, diplomat, librarian, and genealogist for the House of Hanover, and contributed to diverse areas. His impact continues to reverberate, especially his original contributions in logic and binary representations.

Achievements and contributions

Devices 
 Leibniz calculator

Logic 

 Alphabet of human thought
 Calculus ratiocinator

Mathematics 
 Calculus

 General Leibniz rule
 Leibniz formula for 
 Leibniz integral rule

Philosophy 
 Best of all possible worlds
 Characteristica universalis
 Identity of indiscernibles
 Pre-established harmony
 Principle of sufficient reason

Physics

Personal life 

 Leibniz's political views 
 Leibniz's religious views

Family

Major works by Leibniz 

 De Arte Combinatoria
 Discourse on Metaphysics, (text at wikisource)
 Monadology, (text at wikisource)
 New Essays on Human Understanding
 Nova Methodus pro Maximis et Minimis
 Protogaea
 Théodicée

Manuscript archives and translations of Leibniz's works 

 Leibniz Archive (Hannover)  at the Leibniz Research Center - Hannover
 Leibniz Archive (Potsdam) at the Brandenburg Academy of Humanities and Sciences
 Leibniz Archive (Munster), Leibniz-Forschungsstelle Münster digital edition
 Leibniz Archive (Berlin), digital edition
  Donald Rutherford's translations at UCSD
 Lloyd Strickland's translations at leibniz-translations.com

Journals focused on Leibniz studies 
 The Leibniz Review
 Studia Leibnitiana

Organizations named after Leibniz 

 Leibniz Association
 Leibniz College, affiliated with the University of Tübingen
 Leibniz Institute of European History
 Leibniz Institute for Polymer Research
 Leibniz Society of North America
 Leibniz Supercomputing Center, (more details in German version)
 Leibniz University Hannover
 ZBW – Leibniz Information Centre for Economics
 Leibniz Schools in Germany

Prizes named after Leibniz 

 Gottfried Wilhelm Leibniz Prize. It is regarded as the highest German award.
 Leibniz Ring awarded by the Hannover Press Club.
  Berlin Leibniz Medal originally awarded by the Royal Prussian Academy of Sciences; currently awarded by the Berlin-Brandenburg Academy of Sciences and Humanities.
 Leibniz Medal (Mainz) awarded by the Mainz Academy of Sciences and Literature.

Publications about Leibniz 

Maria Rosa Antognazza's 2009 Leibniz biography is a major recent resource.

See also 

 Gottfried Wilhelm Leibniz bibliography
  German Wikipedia Leibniz page; it contains additional information.

References

External links 

 Webpage at the Leibniz Association
 Webpage at the Mainz Research Alliance
 Leibniz Association
 Leibniz on Wikisource

Leibniz, G
Leibniz, G
Gottfried Wilhelm Leibniz